Bodenheimer is a surname. Notable people with the surname include:
 (born 1965), Swiss literary scholar and author
 (1944-2017), Israeli writer and educator , director 
 (1923-2011), Swiss physician , psychiatrist , psychoanalyst and author of provocative essays and books
Edgar Bodenheimer (1908-1991), US law professor and author
Friedrich Simon Bodenheimer (1897-1959), German-born Israeli entomologist
George Bodenheimer (born 1958), President of ESPN Inc.
 (1807-1868), German rabbi
Levi Bodenheimer, (1807-1867), German consistorial rabbi and author
Max Bodenheimer (1865-1940), lawyer and one of the main figures in German Zionism
Shimon Fritz Bodenheimer (1897-1959), Israeli biologist and zoologist
 (1874-1966), German-Jewish banker
 (1905-1975),
 (born 1941), Israeli physicist

See also
Bodenheim (disambiguation)

German-language surnames
Jewish surnames
Yiddish-language surnames